Brandon Hagy (born March 21, 1991) is an American professional golfer.

In college, he competed for the California Golden Bears.  While there, he won the 2014 Byron Nelson Award.

After turning pro in 2014, Hagy competed in Web.com Tour Q School but failed to advance to the final stage, and therefore had no status on any major tour in 2015. Through sponsor exemptions and Monday qualifying, he made six starts in 2015 on the Web.com Tour and eight on the PGA Tour, including the 2015 U.S. Open, for which he earned a spot through local and sectional qualifying.

Hagy finished tied for 79th at the final stage of Web.com Tour Q School in 2015, earning conditional status for the 2016 Web.com Tour. Thanks to five top-ten finishes in 16 events, he finished 19th on the regular-season money list, earning a PGA Tour card for the 2017 season. 

Hagy was not considered a PGA Tour rookie for 2017 since he played in eight PGA Tour events in 2015 (more than seven allowed to retain rookie status). He recorded a top-5 finish at that season's RBC Canadian Open, which helped him to make the 2017 FedEx Cup Playoffs and finish the season 113th to retain his tour card for 2018. 

Hagy missed most of the 2018 season due to a wrist injury. He played just three events, with a best result of T18 at Sanderson Farms Championship, and finished the season 215th in points. He was healthy again in 2019 and made a number of starts on PGA Tour thanks to being granted a major medical extension.

Playoff record
Web.com Tour playoff record (0–1)

Results in major championships
Results not in chronological order in 2020.

CUT = missed the half-way cut
NT = No tournament due to COVID-19 pandemic

Results in The Players Championship

CUT = missed the halfway cut

U.S. national team appearances
Amateur
Palmer Cup:  2014

See also
2016 Web.com Tour Finals graduates
2019 Korn Ferry Tour Finals graduates

References

External links

American male golfers
California Golden Bears men's golfers
PGA Tour golfers
Korn Ferry Tour graduates
Golfers from Santa Monica, California
1991 births
Living people